Lesław Ćmikiewicz (born 25 August 1948 in Wrocław) is a retired Polish football player and manager. He played for Polish clubs including Śląsk Wrocław and Legia Warsaw. He also played for the New York Arrows and Chicago Horizon in the Major Indoor Soccer League.

Ćmikiewicz played for the Polish national team, for which he earned 57 caps. He was a participant at the 1972 Summer Olympics, where Poland won the gold medal; at the 1976 Summer Olympics, where Poland won the silver medal and at the 1974 FIFA World Cup, where Poland won the bronze medal.

As a coach, he coached a few Polish football clubs, including Stal Rzeszów and later most notably and briefly, the Polish national team and U-21 Polish team. He currently works as an assistant coach at Cracovia.

References

External links
Profile on Polish Olympic Committee

1948 births
Living people
Sportspeople from Wrocław
Polish footballers
Chicago Horizons players
Major Indoor Soccer League (1978–1992) players
Olympic footballers of Poland
Olympic gold medalists for Poland
Poland international footballers
Olympic silver medalists for Poland
Śląsk Wrocław players
Legia Warsaw players
New York Arrows players
Footballers at the 1972 Summer Olympics
Footballers at the 1976 Summer Olympics
Olympic medalists in football
Medalists at the 1976 Summer Olympics
Medalists at the 1972 Summer Olympics
1974 FIFA World Cup players
Polish expatriate footballers
Expatriate soccer players in the United States
Polish expatriate sportspeople in the United States
Ekstraklasa players
Association football midfielders
Polish football managers
Motor Lublin managers
Stal Rzeszów managers
Górnik Zabrze managers
Pogoń Szczecin managers
Poland national football team managers
Tur Turek managers